Kimbrell may refer to:

Kimbrell (surname)
Kimbrell, Alabama, an unincorporated community in the U.S.
Kimbrell, Kentucky, an unincorporated community in the U.S.